Abramovka is a rural locality (a selo) in Izvestkovskoye Urban Settlement of Obluchensky District, Jewish Autonomous Oblast, Russia. The population was 1 as of 2010.

Geography 
The village is located on Trans-Siberian Railway, 52 km east of Obluchye (the district's administrative centre) by road. Snarsky is the nearest rural locality.

References 

Rural localities in the Jewish Autonomous Oblast